Pom Poko is a Norwegian post punk band from Oslo, Norway. The band was formed in 2017 and quickly gained a reputation for their live shows, earning them a spot on NME's "100 Bands to Watch" list in 2018. Pom Poko signed to British label Bella Union in 2019, where they released their debut album, Birthday, to positive reviews. They released their second album, Cheater, to critical acclaim in 2021.

History 
Pom Poko was formed in 2017 and quickly gained a reputation for their live shows, earning them a spot on NME's "100 Bands to Watch" list that year. In 2019, they signed to Bella Union. They released their debut album, Birthday, to positive reviews that same year.  In 2021, they released their second album, Cheater, to critical acclaim.

The band is named after Pom Poko, a Japanese animated film released by Studio Ghibli in 1994.

Members
Current
Ragnhild Fangel – lead vocals (2017–present)
Martin Tonne – guitar (2017–present)
Jonas Krøvel – bass (2017–present)
Ola Djupvik – drums (2017–present)

Discography

Albums
 Birthday (2019, Bella Union)
 Cheater (2021, Bella Union)

EPs
 This Is Our House (2022, Bella Union)

References

External links
 

Norwegian rock music groups
Norwegian experimental rock groups
Musical groups established in 2017
Bella Union artists
2017 establishments in Norway